József Lőrincz (born 13 April 1985) is a Romanian professional footballer who plays as a defender.

Career
On 6 February 2019, Lőrincz returned to Gloria Bistrița.

References

External links
 
 

1985 births
Living people
Romanian footballers
ACF Gloria Bistrița players
FCM Dunărea Galați players
FC Bihor Oradea players
FC Gloria Buzău players
CS Brănești players
FC Delta Dobrogea Tulcea players
FC Botoșani players
AFC Unirea Slobozia players
FK Csíkszereda Miercurea Ciuc players
CS Gloria Bistrița-Năsăud footballers
Liga I players
Liga II players
Liga III players
Association football defenders